The following is a list of medical schools (or universities with a medical school), in Oceania.

Oceania

Australia

Cook Islands
James Cook School of Medicine

Fiji
Fiji National University, College of Medicine, Nursing and Health Sciences
Umanand Prasad School of Medicine at the University of Fiji

New Zealand
University of Auckland, Faculty of Medical and Health Sciences, (satellite clinical schools at Waikato and Whangarei)
University of Otago, School of Medicine, (satellite clinical schools at Wellington and Christchurch).

Papua New Guinea
University of Papua New Guinea, School of Medicine and Health Sciences
Divine Word University, Faculty of Medicine and Health Sciences

Samoa
Oceania University of Medicine
National University of Samoa, School of Medicine

=

References

External links
 World Directory of Medical Schools

Oceania